Taha Hussein Yaseen (born 1 January 1998) is an Iraqi sprinter specialising in the 400 metres. He represented his country at the 2019 World Championships without advancing from the first round. Earlier that year he finished sixth at the 2019 Asian Championships.

International competitions

Personal bests
Outdoor
200 metres – 21.77 (+0.5 m/s, Tlemcen 2016)
400 metres – 45.74 (Doha 2019) NR
Indoor
400 metres – 49.03 (Tehran 2019)

References

1998 births
Living people
Iraqi male sprinters
World Athletics Championships athletes for Iraq
Athletes (track and field) at the 2018 Asian Games
Asian Games competitors for Iraq
Athletes (track and field) at the 2020 Summer Olympics
Olympic athletes of Iraq